The Keeper's House at Williamsbridge Reservoir is a historic home located in the Borough of the Bronx in New York City. It was built in 1889 as part of the Williamsbridge Reservoir complex. It is a -story, L-shaped stone house. The stones used to build the house were pieces of granite taken from the excavation of the reservoir it was to serve.

It was listed on the National Register of Historic Places in 1999. At that time, it was acquired by the Mosholu Preservation Corporation, a non-profit enterprise founded by the Montefiore Medical Center in 1981, intended as a powerful antidote to widespread housing deterioration and abandonment in its surrounding neighborhood in the Norwood section of the Bronx. The corporation did a major renovation of the building and restored it to the point where it could provide modern conveniences. The house now serves as the corporation's headquarters. It is also the headquarters for the Norwood News.

See also
List of New York City Designated Landmarks in The Bronx
National Register of Historic Places in Bronx County, New York
Norwood News

References

Houses on the National Register of Historic Places in the Bronx
Houses completed in 1889
Houses in the Bronx
New York City Designated Landmarks in the Bronx
Norwood, Bronx